Barbara Gayle (born 6 December 1972) is a swimmer who represents Guam. She competed in the women's 100 metre butterfly at the 1988 Summer Olympics, finishing last, in 40th place.

References

External links
 

1972 births
Living people
Guamanian female butterfly swimmers
Olympic swimmers of Guam
Swimmers at the 1988 Summer Olympics
Place of birth missing (living people)
21st-century American women